The Tirath Singh Rawat ministry was the ministry in the Cabinet of Uttarakhand headed by the Chief Minister of Uttarakhand, Tirath Singh Rawat.

Council of Ministers

References

R
Bharatiya Janata Party state ministries
Cabinets established in 2021
2021 establishments in Uttarakhand